Hamish Stewart (born 3 March 1998) is an Australian rugby union player who played six seasons for the in the Super Rugby competition after a late-season debut in 2017. He signed a two-year deal to play for the Western Force on August 5, 2022. His main positions are fly-half/inside centre. On May 8, 2021, he celebrated the first title in a decade for the Queensland Reds when he played at inside centre in the Super Rugby AU final at Suncorp Stadium. Stewart made seven tackles in the midfield and played solidly for the full 80 minutes in the 19-16 victory over the ACT Brumbies in front of 41,637 fans. He is highly regarded for his stout and fearless defence and work over the ball which is a throwback to starting out as a schoolboy flanker. A versatile contributor, he has a smart running and passing game. In 2022, he was recognised with selection for Australia A in games against Samoa, Tonga and Japan (two). He previously represented Australia in the national under 20s team. In 2017, he started at flyhalf in the Queensland Country side that beat the Canberra Vikings 42-28 in Canberra to win the final of the 2017 National Rugby Championship.

References 

Australian rugby union players
1998 births
Living people
Rugby union fly-halves
Rugby union centres
Queensland Country (NRC team) players
Queensland Reds players
Rugby union players from Queensland
Western Force players